The 2013–14 Swiss Challenge League (known for sponsorship reasons as the Brack.ch Challenge League) was the 11th season of the Swiss Challenge League, the second tier in the Swiss football pyramid. It began on 13 July 2013 and  ended on 18 May 2014.

Teams 
2012–13 Challenge League champions Aarau were promoted to the 2013–14 Super League. Due to financial irregularities, Bellinzona was ultimately relegated at the end of the season and later dissolved. Locarno was spared from relegation.

The bottom five teams – Stade Nyonnais, Étoile Carouge, Delémont, Kriens and Brühl – were relegated to the newly formed 1. Liga Promotion. No teams replaced them due to the Challenge League being reduced from 16 to 10 teams.

1 Promoted from the 1. Liga Promotion

2 Relegated from the Raiffeisen Super League

League table

Results
Teams played each other twice over the course of the season, home and away, for a total of 36 matches per team.

First and Second Round

Third and Fourth Round

Top scorers

Source:

References

External links
 
Soccerway

Swiss
2
Swiss Challenge League seasons